Jamuna Oil Company Ltd (JOCL) (estd. as Pakistan National Oil in 1964; renamed as Bangladesh National Oil in 1972) (DSE:JOCL ) is a subsidiary of the Bangladesh Petroleum Corporation that nationally markets octane, petrol, diesel, kerosene, furnace oil, bitumen and lubricants in Bangladesh. In 1975, it was renamed Jamuna Oil Company (JOCL) after the river Jamuna. It is headquartered in Chittagong, Bangladesh.

History
In 1964 Pakistan National Oil Limited (PNOL), the maiden National oil company of the then Pakistan was established as a private limited company. The company started functioning with an authorized capital of Tk.2.00 crore. After the Independence of Bangladesh in 1971 the Government of the People's Republic of Bangladesh acquired the assets and liabilities of Pakistan National Oil Limited by virtue of Bangladesh Abandoned Property (control, Management & Disposal) Order, 1972 (P. O. No. 16 of 1972) and the company was renamed as Bangladesh National Oil Limited. The company has been finally renamed as Jamuna Oil Company Limited (JOCL) by the Government on 13 January 1973. At that time the company was operated by an adhoc committee called Oil Companies Advisory Committee (OCAC) under Petrobangla, constitute by the notification No. 21 m-4/76 (NR) dated 21-4-73, M/O. Natural Resources.

Jamuna Oil Company Limited was registered with the registrar of Joint Stock Companies & Firms as fully Government owned Private Limited Company on 12 March 1975 under Companies Act 1913 with authorized capital of Tk. 10.00 crore and paid-up capital of Tk. 5.00 crore. Subsequently, in the year 1976 the assets and liabilities of the company were transferred & handed over to Bangladesh Petroleum Corporation (BPC) as per schedule stated in clause 31(c) of BPC Ordinance No. LXXXVIII (published in Bangladesh Gazette extra ordinary on 13 November 1976). Since then Jamuna Oil Company Limited has been functioning as a Subsidiary of BPC. On 1 January 1986 all assets and liabilities of Indo-Burmah Petroleum Company Limited (IBPCL) were transferred to the company.

In 2005-2006 FY the paid-up capital of the company was increased to Tk. 10.00 crore from Tk. 5.00 crore by issuing of bonus share out of its profit. The company was converted into a Public Limited Company from a Private Limited Company on 25 June 2007 and its authorized capital was increased to Tk. 300.00 crore. On 10 August 2007 the paid-up capital of the company was increased to Tk.45.00 crore by issuing bonus share of Tk. 35.00 crore. The company was enlisted with Dhaka Stock Exchange Limited and Chittagong Stock Exchange Limited on 9 January 2008 with a view to off-load 1.35 crore shares of Tk.10.00 each under direct listing procedure and accordingly the shares of the company were off-loaded in the capital market.

Organization and structure
Jamuna Oil is managed by a Board of Directors, a team of 6 executives, all of them are nominated by the Government of Bangladesh.

The board is responsible for over all decisions and top policy making body of the company. General Manager, the Chief Executive of the company is appointed by Bangladesh Petroleum Corporation in addition to approval by the Government. 
The Chairman is the Joint Secretary of (Energy & Mineral Resources Division) at the Ministry of Power, Energy & Mineral Resource of the Government of Bangladesh. 
The General Manager is the top official and executive from Jamuna Oil Company, at Chittagong of the Government of Bangladesh.
The First Director is a member of (Tax Admn. & Director National Board of Revenue, at Dhaka) of the Government of Bangladesh. 
The Second Director is the Joint Secretary of Ministry of Commerce, Dhaka, The Government of Bangladesh. 
The Third Director is the Joint Secretary of Ministry of Finance, Dhaka, The Government of Bangladesh. 
The Fourth Director is the Deputy Secretary of Ministry of Power, Energy & Mineral Resource, Dhaka, The Government of Bangladesh.

In recent times, the board has added 2 more directors who are all nominated by the National Government.

Operations
335 filling stations, 573 Distributors Point and 153 Packed Paint Dealers. Besides, the Company delivers products directly to industries and Power Plants. Apart from that, Company has 732 Liquefied petroleum gas dealers and 83 pesticide dealers. Company gets supply of LPG from LP Gas Limited, Chittagong and Kailashtila Project, Sylhet. The present employee strength of the company is 591 which include 176 officers, 123 staff and 292 workers.

References

External links

 Official Website jamunaoil.gov.bd
 Organization History

Oil and gas companies of Bangladesh
Companies based in Chittagong
Non-renewable resource companies established in 1964
1964 establishments in East Pakistan
Companies listed on the Chittagong Stock Exchange